Najbolje do sada may refer to:

 Najbolje do sada (Boban Rajović album), 2009
 Najbolje do sada... (Šako Polumenta album), 2005